The 2000 Coppa Italia Final decided the winner of the 1999–2000 Coppa Italia. It was played over two legs and won 2–1 on aggregate by Lazio over Internazionale. It was Lazio's fourth Coppa Italia Final and third win.

First leg

Second leg

References

External links
rsssf.com

Coppa Italia Finals
Coppa Italia Final 2000
Coppa Italia Final 2000